James Patrick "Shea" Neary (born 18 May 1968) is a British former professional boxer who competed from 1992 to 2000. He held the WBU light-welterweight title from 1996 to 2000, and challenged once for the Commonwealth light-welterweight title in the latter year.

Amateur career
Neary fought as an amateur from the age of 15, compiling a record of 21 fights and 3 losses.

Professional career
Neary made his professional debut on 3 September 1992, defeating fellow debutant Simon Ford by knockout in the first round. On 8 September 1995, Neary won his first regional championship—the vacant British Central Area title—by knocking out Nigel Bradley in two rounds. Three fights later, on 26 October 1996, Neary scored a twelve-round unanimous decision over Darryl Tyson to win the vacant WBU light-welterweight title. He made five successful defences of the title, all televised nationally on ITV's The Big Fight Live. One of these defences included a sixth-round stoppage over former British light-welterweight champion Andy Holligan on 12 March 1998.

On 11 March 2000, Neary fought Micky Ward as part of the undercard to Naseem Hamed vs. Vuyani Bungu. This brought Neary international exposure for the first time, as the event was televised in the United States by HBO on their World Championship Boxing series. In a high-paced, action-packed slugfest, Ward handed Neary his first loss by stopping him in the eighth round. The fight was dramatised in the 2010 film The Fighter, with Anthony Molinari playing the part of Neary.

Neary won one more fight on 25 July 2000, scoring a ten-round points decision over Alan Bosworth. However, Neary had struggled to make weight before the fight, and was quoted as having lacked motivation coming in. On 11 November 2000, in what would be Neary's final fight, he lost via points decision to then-reigning Commonwealth light-welterweight champion Eamonn Magee. The result, judged by referee Roy Francis, was viewed as controversial.

Personal life
Neary's father moved from Ireland to Liverpool in the 1940s, and during his career Neary was embraced as both an Irishman and a Scouser. On 2 May 2011, Neary was arrested following a brawl at the Revolution bar in Albert Dock, Liverpool, but was later cleared of assault charges in December.

Neary's son James Metcalf, nicknamed "Kid Shamrock", became a professional boxer in 2011 and competes as a light-middleweight. He has called his father "a huge inspiration growing up", and the reason he wanted to be a boxer.

Professional boxing record

References

External links

1968 births
Living people
Boxers from Liverpool
English male boxers
English people of Irish descent
Irish male boxers
Light-welterweight boxers